Angoori rasmalai is an Indian dessert and a type of Ras malai. It is similar to the Odisha dish, Khira sagara. The dessert is made from cottage cheese which is then soaked in chashni, a sugary syrup, and rolled in fine sugar to form grape-sized balls.

Angoori derives its name from Angoor which is Hindi for grape, and Punjabi for malted barley signifying the shape and form, and also alluding to its sweetness.

Indian desserts
Cheese dishes